Jagannath Prasad Das (often referred to as  JP Das ) (born 20 January 1931) is an Indo-Canadian educational psychologist and an internationally recognized expert in educational psychology, intelligence and childhood development. Among his contributions to psychology are the PASS theory of intelligence and the Das-Naglieri Cognitive Assessment System. Das was the  Director of the JP Das Developmental Disabilities Centre at the University of Alberta. He formally retired in 1996, and is currently Emeritus Director of the  Centre on Developmental and Learning Disabilities and Emeritus Professor of Educational Psychology at the University of Alberta. He is a member of the Royal Society of Canada, was inducted into the Order of Canada and has an Honorary Doctorate degree from the University of Vigo in Spain.

Biography 

JP Das was born in Puri, a city on the coast of the Bay of Bengal in Odisha, India. He is one of six siblings, and was educated in Cuttack, from grade 2 to the completion of his B.A. degree.
He earned a B.A. Honours in Psychology and Philosophy from Ravenshaw college (now university) in Cuttack. He then completed an M.A. in Experimental Psychology at Patna University, India.

After two years as a lecturer in Psychology at Utkal University, in 1955 he won a Government of India scholarship to study at the Institute of Psychiatry University of London, supervised by Hans Eysenck.  He chose for his dissertation an investigation into the relationship between hypnosis, eyelid conditioning and reactive inhibition. After earning his Ph.D. in 1957, he returned to Utkal University where he was a Lecturer in Psychology, and then a Reader in Psychology, for five years. In 1963, he was awarded a Kennedy Foundation Visiting Professorship at Peabody College of Vanderbilt University in Nashville. After a year there, he moved on to UCLA, where he spent a year as a visiting associate professor in Psychology before returning to Utkal University in 1965.

Das moved to the University of Alberta in Edmonton, Alberta, Canada in 1968 as University Research Professor at the Centre for the Study of Mental Retardation that had been established by Donald Ewen Cameron in 1968.  He became the third Director of the centre in 1972 and continued to work at the Centre  until 1994. He formally  retired in 1995, and  continues at the Centre as the Emeritus Director and an Emeritus Professor, still conducting research, as well as writing books and articles.  The Centre was renamed in his honour in 1997.

Das has written more than 300 research papers and book chapters, as well as ten published books.

Later years 
Das is continuing to pursue his work on cognitive processes in typical and atypical populations, particularly on executive functions and speed of processing.  The apparent implications of these higher mental activities on education as well as management is the topic of a new book Cognitive Planning and Executive Functions (JP Das & S.B. Misra, 2014). His other book this year   is   Consciousness Quest where East meets the West (Das, 2014).

Order of Canada 
Das received the Order of Canada,  on 1 July 2015 "for his internationally recognized work in the field of cognitive psychology, notably in the development of a new theory of intelligence."

Honours and awards 

In 2015, Das was named to the Order of Canada. In addition, he has received:
 Doctorate Honoris Causa, University of Cyprus (2015)
 Honorary doctorate in psychology  from the University of Vigo in Spain (2004)
 Kennedy Foundation Professorship, Peabody-Vanderbilt University, Nashville, USA (1963)
 Nuffield Fellow, University of London, UK (1972)
 Albert J. Harris Award, International Reading Association (1979)
 University of Alberta, Research Prize (1987)
 Immigration Achievement Award (1992)
 Fellow of the Royal Society of Canada (FRSC) (1999)
 Distinguished contributions to the International Advancement of Psychology. Canadian Psychology Association (2014)

In recognition of his work, Timothy Papadopoulos, Rauno Parilla and John Kirby edited Cognition, Intelligence &\and Achievement: A Tribute to J.P. Das was published in 2015.  [New York: Elsevier/Academic Press, 2015. ).

Books 
 Das, J. P. (1969). Verbal conditioning and behaviour. Oxford: Pergamon Press.
 Das, J. P., & Baine, D. (Eds.). (1978). Mental retardation for special educators. Springfield: Charles Thomas.
 Das, J. P., Kirby, J. R., & Jarman, R. F. (1979). Simultaneous and successive cognitive processes. New York: Academic Press.
 Friedman, M., Das, J. P., & O'Connor, N. (Eds.). (1981). Intelligence and learning. New York: Plenum Publishing Corp.
 Das, J. P., Mulcahy, R. F., & Wall, A. E. (Eds.). (1982). Theory and Research in Learning Disabilities. New York: Plenum Publishing Corp.
 Das, J. P., Naglieri, J. A., & Kirby, J. R. (1994). Assessment of Cognitive Processes. Boston, MA, USA: Allyn & Bacon. Translated into Chinese
 Das, J. P., Kar, B. C., & Parrila, R. K. (1996). Cognitive planning. New Delhi: Sage Publications.
 Das, J.P. (1997). The Working Mind. New Delhi: Sage Publications.
 Das, J. P. (2009). Reading Difficulties and Dyslexia (Revised & Enlarged edition). SAGE Publications. New Delhi; London; Thousand Oaks, USA
 Das, J. P. (2014). Consciousness Quest Where East meets West: On Mind, Meditation & Neural Correlates. Sage Publications. New Delhi; London; Thousand Oaks, USA
 Das, J.P. & Misra, S. (2014 ). Cognitive Planning and Executive Functions: Applications in Education & Management.  Sage Publications. New Delhi; London; Thousand Oaks, USA
 Das, J. P., Kirby, J. R., & Jarman, R. F. (1979). Simultaneous and successive cognitive processes''. New York: Academic Press.

References 

Living people
1931 births
Canadian psychologists
Utkal University alumni
Patna University alumni
Academic staff of the University of Alberta
Indian emigrants to Canada
Fellows of the Royal Society of Canada
Members of the Order of Canada